De Arend (English The Eagle) is a smock mill in Coevorden, Netherlands. It was built in 1894. The mill is listed as a Rijksmonument, number 11493.

History
De Arend was built by millwrights Ritsema Brothers of Stroobos, Friesland for J B Soppe. It later passed into the ownership of H Soppe. The Dutch magazine De Molenaar of 25 November 1969 stated that the mill was built in 1888. Thus the mill may have been moved here in 1894. In 1937, the mill was repaired and fitted with streamlined sails. The mill was sold to the municipality of Coevorden in 1976. It was in a poor state and overgrown with ivy. Restoration by millwright J D Medendorp of Zuidlaren was completed in 1977.

Description

De Arend is what the Dutch describe as an "achtkante stellingmolen" - an eight-sided smock mill with a stage. The mill has a two-storey brick base and a three-storey smock. The smock and cap are thatched. The cap is winded by a tailpole and winch. The four Common sails are carried on a cast-iron windshaft dating from 1863. The wooden clasp arm brake wheel has 59 cogs. It drives the wallower at the top of the upright shaft. The wallower has 31 cogs. At the bottom of the upright shaft, the great spur wheel with 85 cogs drives two lantern pinion stone nuts, each with 28 staves.

References

Windmills in Drenthe
Smock mills in the Netherlands
Windmills completed in 1894
Rijksmonuments in Drenthe
Octagonal buildings in the Netherlands
De Arend, Coevorden